"Like a Rolling Stone" is a song by American singer-songwriter Bob Dylan, released on July 20, 1965, by Columbia Records. Its confrontational lyrics originated in an extended piece of verse Dylan wrote in June 1965, when he returned exhausted from a grueling tour of England. Dylan distilled this draft into four verses and a chorus. "Like a Rolling Stone" was recorded a few weeks later as part of the sessions for the forthcoming album Highway 61 Revisited.

During a difficult two-day preproduction, Dylan struggled to find the essence of the song, which was demoed without success in  time. A breakthrough was made when it was tried in a rock music format, and rookie session musician Al Kooper improvised the Hammond B2 organ riff for which the track is known. Columbia Records was unhappy with both the song's length at over six minutes and its heavy electric sound, and was hesitant to release it. It was only when, a month later, a copy was leaked to a new popular music club and heard by influential DJs that the song was put out as a single. Although radio stations were reluctant to play such a long track, "Like a Rolling Stone" reached No. 2 in the US Billboard charts (No. 1 in Cashbox) and became a worldwide hit.

Critics have described "Like a Rolling Stone" as revolutionary in its combination of musical elements, the youthful, cynical sound of Dylan's voice, and the directness of the question "How does it feel?". It completed the transformation of Dylan's image from folk singer to rock star, and is considered one of the most influential compositions in postwar popular music. According to review aggregator Acclaimed Music, "Like a Rolling Stone" is statistically the most acclaimed song of all time. Rolling Stone listed it at No. 1 on their 2004 and 2010 "500 Greatest Songs of All Time" lists. It has been covered by many artists, from the Jimi Hendrix Experience and the Rolling Stones to the Wailers and Green Day. At an auction in 2014, Dylan's handwritten lyrics to the song fetched $2 million, a world record for a popular music manuscript.

Writing
In early 1965, after returning from the tour of England documented in the film Dont Look Back, Dylan was unhappy with the public's expectations of him and the direction his career was taking, and considered quitting the music business. He said in a 1966 Playboy interview: Last spring, I guess I was going to quit singing. I was very drained, and the way things were going, it was a very draggy situation ... But 'Like a Rolling Stone' changed it all. I mean it was something that I myself could dig. It's very tiring having other people tell you how much they dig you if you yourself don't dig you.

The song grew out of an extended piece of verse. In 1966, Dylan described its genesis to journalist Jules Siegel:

During 1965, Dylan composed prose, poems, and songs by typing incessantly. Footage in Dont Look Back of Dylan in his suite at London's Savoy Hotel captures this process. However, Dylan told two interviewers that "Like a Rolling Stone" began as a long piece of "vomit" (10 pages long according to one account, 20 according to another) that later acquired musical form. Dylan has never publicly spoken of writing any other major composition in this way. In an interview with CBC Radio in Montreal, Dylan called the creation of the song a "breakthrough", explaining that it changed his perception of where he was going in his career. He said that he found himself writing this long piece of vomit, 20 pages long, and out of it I took 'Like a Rolling Stone' and made it as a single. And I'd never written anything like that before and it suddenly came to me that was what I should do ... After writing that I wasn't interested in writing a novel, or a play. I just had too much, I want to write songs.

From the extended version on paper, Dylan crafted four verses and the chorus in Woodstock, New York. In 2014, when the handwritten lyrics were put up for auction, the four-page manuscript revealed that the full refrain of the chorus does not appear until the fourth page. A rejected third line, "like a dog without a bone" gives way to "now you're unknown". Earlier, Dylan had considered working the name Al Capone into the rhyme scheme, and he attempted to construct a rhyme scheme for "how does it feel?", penciling in "it feels real", "does it feel real", "shut up and deal", "get down and kneel" and "raw deal". The song was written on an upright piano in the key of D flat and was changed to C on the guitar in the recording studio.

Recording 
Dylan invited Chicago blues guitarist Mike Bloomfield to his Woodstock home for the weekend to learn new material. Bloomfield recalled, "The first thing I heard was 'Like a Rolling Stone'. I figured he wanted blues, string bending, because that's what I do. He said, 'Hey, man, I don't want any of that B.B. King stuff'. So, OK, I really fell apart. What the heck does he want? We messed around with the song. I played the way that he dug, and he said it was groovy."

The recording sessions were produced by Tom Wilson on June 15–16, 1965, in Studio A of Columbia Records, 799 Seventh Avenue, in New York City. This would be the last song Wilson would produce for Dylan. In addition to Bloomfield, the musicians enlisted were Paul Griffin on piano, Joe Macho, Jr. on bass, Bobby Gregg on drums, and Bruce Langhorne on tambourine, all booked by Wilson. Gregg, Griffin, and Langhorne had previously worked with Dylan and Wilson on Bringing It All Back Home.

In the first session, on June 15, five takes of the song were recorded in a markedly different style ( waltz time, with Dylan on piano) from the eventual release. The lack of sheet music meant the song had to be played by ear. However, its essence was discovered in the course of the chaotic session. The musicians did not reach the first chorus until the fourth take, but after the following harmonica fill Dylan interrupted, saying, "My voice is gone, man. You wanna try it again?" The session ended shortly afterward. The take was released on the 1991 compilation The Bootleg Series Volumes 1–3 (Rare & Unreleased) 1961–1991.

When the musicians reconvened the following day, June 16, Al Kooper joined the proceedings. Kooper, at that time a 21-year-old session guitarist, was not originally supposed to play but was present in the studio as Wilson's guest. When Wilson stepped out, Kooper sat down with his guitar with the other musicians, hoping to take part in the recording session. By the time Wilson returned, Kooper, who had been intimidated by Bloomfield's guitar playing, was back in the control room. After a couple of rehearsal takes, Wilson moved Griffin from Hammond organ to piano. Kooper approached Wilson and told him he had a good part for the organ. Wilson belittled Kooper's organ skills, but did not forbid him to play. As Kooper later put it, "He just sort of scoffed at me ... He didn't say 'no'—so I went out there." Wilson was surprised to see Kooper at the organ but allowed him to play on the track. When Dylan heard a playback of the song, he insisted that the organ be turned up in the mix, despite Wilson's protestations that Kooper was "not an organ player."

There were 15 recorded takes on June 16. By now the song had evolved into its familiar form, in  time with Dylan on electric guitar. After the fourth take—the master take that was released as a single—Wilson happily commented, "That sounds good to me." Despite this, Dylan and the band recorded the song 11 more times.

The complete recording sessions that produced "Like a Rolling Stone", including all 20 takes and the individual "stems" that comprise the four-track master, were released in November 2015 on the 6-disc and 18-disc versions of The Bootleg Series Vol. 12: The Cutting Edge 1965–1966.

Themes
Unlike conventional chart hits of the time, "Like a Rolling Stone" featured lyrics that were interpreted as expressions of resentment rather than love. Author Oliver Trager characterizes the lyrics as "Dylan's sneer at a woman who has fallen from grace and is reduced to fending for herself in a hostile, unfamiliar world." The song's subject, "Miss Lonely," previously opted for easy options in life—she attended the finest schools and enjoyed high-placed friends—but now that her situation has become difficult, it appears that she has no meaningful experiences to define her character. The opening lines of the song establish the character's former condition:

And the first verse ends with lines that seemingly deride her current condition:

Despite the obvious vitriol, the song's narrator also seems to show compassion for Miss Lonely, and expresses joy for her in the freedom in losing everything. Jann Wenner commented: "Everything has been stripped away. You're on your own, you're free now ... You're so helpless and now you've got nothing left. And you're invisible—you've got no secrets—that's so liberating. You've nothing to fear anymore." The final verse ends with the lines:

The refrain seems to emphasize these themes:

Dylan biographer Robert Shelton gave this interpretation: A song that seems to hail the dropout life for those who can take it segues into compassion for those who have dropped out of bourgeois surroundings. 'Rolling Stone' is about the loss of innocence and the harshness of experience. Myths, props, and old beliefs fall away to reveal a very taxing reality.

Dylan humorously commented on the song's moral perspective at a press conference at KQED television studio on December 3, 1965. When a reporter, suggesting that the song adopted a harsh perspective on a girl, asked Dylan, "Are you hard on [people in your songs] because you want to torment them? Or to change their lives and make them know themselves?", Dylan replied while laughing, "I want to needle them."

Commentators attempted to tie the characters in the song to specific people in Dylan's personal life in 1965. In his book POPism: The Warhol '60s, Andy Warhol recalled that some people in his circle believed that "Like a Rolling Stone" contained hostile references to him; he was told, "Listen to 'Like a Rolling Stone'—I think you're the diplomat on the chrome horse, man." The reason behind Dylan's alleged hostility to Warhol was supposedly Warhol's treatment of actress and model Edie Sedgwick. It has been suggested that Sedgwick is the basis of the Miss Lonely character. Sedgwick was briefly involved with Dylan in late 1965 and early 1966, around which time there was some discussion of the two making a movie together. According to Warhol's collaborator Paul Morrissey, Sedgwick may have been in love with Dylan, and was shocked when she found out that Dylan had secretly married Sara Lownds in November 1965. However, in The Bob Dylan Encyclopedia, Michael Gray argues that Sedgwick had no connection with "Like a Rolling Stone", but states "there's no doubt that the ghost of Edie Sedgwick hangs around Blonde on Blonde".

Greil Marcus alluded to a suggestion by art historian Thomas E. Crow that Dylan had written the song as a comment on Warhol's scene:

I heard a lecture by Thomas Crow ... about "Like a Rolling Stone" being about Edie Sedgwick within Andy Warhol's circle, as something that Dylan saw from the outside, not being personally involved with either of them, but as something he saw and was scared by and saw disaster looming and wrote a song as a warning, and it was compelling.

Joan Baez, Marianne Faithfull and Bob Neuwirth have also been suggested as possible targets of Dylan's scorn. Dylan's biographer Howard Sounes warned against reducing the song to the biography of one person, and suggested "it is more likely that the song was aimed generally at those [Dylan] perceived as being 'phony. Sounes adds, "There is some irony in the fact that one of the most famous songs of the folk-rock era—an era associated primarily with ideals of peace and harmony—is one of vengeance."

Mike Marqusee has written at length on the conflicts in Dylan's life during this time, with its deepening alienation from his old folk-revival audience and clear-cut leftist causes. He suggests that the song is probably self-referential: "The song only attains full poignancy when one realises it is sung, at least in part, to the singer himself: he's the one 'with no direction home. Dylan himself has noted that, after his motorcycle accident in 1966, he realized that "when I used words like 'he' and 'it' and 'they,' and talking about other people, I was really talking about nobody but me."

The song is also notable for the amazing characters that surround the heroine. Andy Gill recalls the strangeness contained in the lyrics: "Who, fascinated fans debated, was Miss Lonely, Napoleon in rags and—most bizarre of all—the diplomat who rode a chrome horse while balancing a Siamese cat upon his shoulder? What on earth was going on here?" The diplomat in question, in the third verse:

One interpretation was formulated in Jean-Michel Buizard's 2021 essay, Like a Rolling Stone Revisited: Une relecture de Dylan [French:A Re-reading of Dylan], which sheds new light on the possible identity of Miss Lonely and company. The central idea is that in 1965, the young Dylan remained secretly haunted by the country blues, which formed the framework of his first album (Bob Dylan, 1962) and of which he would say in 2004 in his Chronicles: "it was a counterpart of myself". The song is then conceived as a half-historical half-imaginary tale in which the old blues, once sovereign in the Southern countryside, surrounded by its servants, the bluesmen, finds itself alone and abandoned in the 1940s, when these same bluesmen, following the great wave of migration of the black population, left for the cities of the North and founded there a modern blues, electrified and emptied of its roots. Miss Lonely is thus "an allegory of country blues".

Muddy Waters, author in 1950 of a well-known blues entitled "Rollin' Stone" is emblematic of this great history of the blues. He is the one we find as a "diplomat" shouldering his guitar (the "Siamese cat") on the train (the "chrome horse") that took him to Chicago in 1943, where he transformed the blues of his childhood into the city blues that made him famous ("he took from you everything he could steal"). Other legendary bluesmen appear in the song: presumably Blind Lemon Jefferson as "the mystery tramp" in the second verse and Robert Johnson, "Napoleon in rags," in the final one.

Release
According to Shaun Considine, release coordinator for Columbia Records in 1965, "Like a Rolling Stone" was first relegated to the "graveyard of canceled releases" because of concerns from the sales and marketing departments over its unprecedented six-minute length and "raucous" rock sound. In the days following the rejection, Considine took a discarded acetate of the song to the New York club Arthur—a newly opened disco popular with celebrities and the media—and asked a DJ to play it. At the crowd's insistence, the demo was played repeatedly, until finally it wore out. The next morning, a disc jockey and a programming director from the city's leading top 40 stations called Columbia and demanded copies. Shortly afterward, on July 20, 1965, "Like a Rolling Stone" was released as a single with "Gates of Eden" as its B-side.

Despite its length, the song is Dylan's most commercially successful release, remaining in the US charts for 12 weeks, where it reached number 2. The song that held it from the top spot was the Beatles' "Help!". The promotional copies released to disc jockeys on July 15 had the first two verses and two refrains on one side of the disk, and the remainder of the song on the other. DJs wishing to play the entire song would simply flip the vinyl over. While many radio stations were reluctant to play "Like a Rolling Stone" in its entirety, public demand eventually forced them to air it in full. This helped the single reach its number 2 peak, several weeks after its release. It was a Top 10 hit in other countries, including Canada, Ireland, the Netherlands, and the UK.

In its contemporary review, Cash Box described "Like a Rolling Stone" as a "funky, rhythmic ode which proclaims the artist’s philosophy of rugged individualism."

Music video
In November 2013, forty-eight years after the release of the song, Dylan's website released an official music video for "Like a Rolling Stone". Created by the digital agency Interlude, the video is interactive, allowing viewers to use their keyboards to flip through 16 channels that imitate TV formats, including game shows, shopping networks and reality series. People on each channel appear to lip-sync the song's lyrics. Video director Vania Heymann stated, "I'm using the medium of television to look back right at us – you're flipping yourself to death with switching channels [in real life]." The video contains an hour and 15 minutes' worth of content in all and features appearances from comedian Marc Maron, rapper Danny Brown, The Price Is Right host Drew Carey, SportsCenter anchor Steve Levy, Jonathan and Drew Scott of Property Brothers, and Pawn Stars cast members Rick Harrison and Austin "Chumlee" Russell. The video was released to publicize the release of a 35-album box set, Bob Dylan: The Complete Album Collection Vol. One, containing Dylan's 35 official studio albums and 11 live albums. The Guinness Book of World Records recorded it as the longest wait for an official music video.

Live performances
Dylan performed the song live for the first time within days of its release, when he appeared at the Newport Folk Festival on July 25, 1965, in Newport, Rhode Island. Many of the audience's folk enthusiasts objected to Dylan's use of electric guitars, looking down on rock 'n roll, as Bloomfield put it, as popular amongst "greasers, heads, dancers, people who got drunk and boogied." According to Dylan's friend, music critic Paul Nelson, "The audience [was] booing and yelling 'Get rid of the electric guitar, while Dylan and his backing musicians gave an uncertain rendition of their new single. Al Kooper, who offers a different version of the crowd's reaction, claims that it was due to the length of the set they had just played, being only 15 minutes while other artists had done 45 minute sets.

Highway 61 Revisited was issued at the end of August 1965. When Dylan went on tour that fall he asked the future members of The Band to accompany him in performing the electric half of the concerts. "Like a Rolling Stone" took the closing slot on his setlist and held it, with rare exceptions, through the end of his 1966 "world tour." On May 17, 1966, during the last leg of the tour, Dylan and his band performed at Free Trade Hall in Manchester, England. Just before they started to play the track, an audience member yelled "Judas!", apparently referring to Dylan's supposed "betrayal" of folk music. Dylan responded, "I don't believe you... You're a liar!" With that, he turned to the band, ordering them to "play it fucking loud!".

Since then, "Like a Rolling Stone" has remained a staple in Dylan's concerts, often with revised arrangements. It was included in his 1969 Isle of Wight show and in both his reunion tour with The Band in 1974 and the Rolling Thunder Revue tour in 1975–76. The song continued to be featured in other tours throughout the 1970s and 1980s. According to Dylan's official website, he performed the song live over 2,000 times, as of 2019.

Live performances of the song are included on Self Portrait (recorded at the Isle of Wight, August 31, 1969), Before the Flood (recorded February 13, 1974), Bob Dylan at Budokan (recorded March 1, 1978), MTV Unplugged (recorded November 18, 1994), The Bootleg Series Vol. 4: Bob Dylan Live 1966, The "Royal Albert Hall" Concert (recorded in Manchester, UK, May 17, 1966; same recording also available on The Bootleg Series Vol. 7: No Direction Home: The Soundtrack), The Band's 2001 reissue of Rock of Ages (recorded January 1, 1972), and The Bootleg Series Vol. 13: Trouble No More 1979–1981 (Deluxe Edition) (recorded June 27, 1981). In 2016, all Dylan's recorded live performances of the song from 1966 were released in the boxed set The 1966 Live Recordings, with the May 26, 1966 Royal Albert Hall performance released separately on the album The Real Royal Albert Hall 1966 Concert.

The July 1965 Newport performance of the song is included in Murray Lerner's film The Other Side of the Mirror, while a May 21, 1966, performance in Newcastle, England is featured in Martin Scorsese's documentary No Direction Home, along with footage of the above-mentioned May 17 heckling incident.

Besides appearing on Highway 61 Revisited, the song's standard release can be found on the compilations Bob Dylan's Greatest Hits, Biograph, The Best of Bob Dylan (1997), The Essential Bob Dylan, The Best of Bob Dylan (2005), and Dylan. The mono version appears on The Original Mono Recordings. In addition, the early, incomplete studio recording in  time appears on The Bootleg Series Vol. 2.

Legacy
The song's sound has been described as revolutionary in its combination of electric guitar licks, organ chords, and Dylan's voice, at once young and jeeringly cynical. Critic Michael Gray described the track as "a chaotic amalgam of blues, impressionism, allegory, and an intense directness in the central chorus: 'How does it feel. The song had an enormous impact on popular culture and rock music. Its success made Dylan a pop icon, as Paul Williams notes:

Paul Rothchild, producer of the Doors' first five albums, recalled the elation that an American musician had made a record that successfully challenged the primacy of the British Invasion groups. He said, What I realized when I was sitting there is that one of US—one of the so-called Village hipsters—was making music that could compete with THEM—the Beatles, and the Stones, and the Dave Clark Five—without sacrificing any of the integrity of folk music or the power of rock'n'roll.

The song had a huge impact on Bruce Springsteen, who was 15 years old when he first heard it. Springsteen described the moment during his speech inducting Dylan into the Rock and Roll Hall of Fame in 1988 and also assessed the long-term significance of "Like a Rolling Stone":

Dylan's contemporaries in 1965 were both startled and challenged by the single. Paul McCartney remembered going around to John Lennon's house in Weybridge to hear the song. According to McCartney, "It seemed to go on and on forever. It was just beautiful ... He showed all of us that it was possible to go a little further." Frank Zappa had a more extreme reaction: "When I heard 'Like a Rolling Stone', I wanted to quit the music business, because I felt: 'If this wins and it does what it's supposed to do, I don't need to do anything else ...' But it didn't do anything. It sold but nobody responded to it in the way that they should have." Nearly forty years later, in 2003, Elvis Costello commented on the innovative quality of the single. "What a shocking thing to live in a world where there was Manfred Mann and the Supremes and Engelbert Humperdinck and here comes 'Like a Rolling Stone'".

Although CBS tried to make the record more "radio friendly" by cutting it in half and spreading it over both sides of the vinyl, both Dylan and fans demanded that the full duration of the recording should be placed on one side and that radio stations play the song in its entirety. The success of "Like a Rolling Stone" was influential in changing the music business convention regarding the length of singles, whereby they were restricted to durations of less than three minutes. In the words of the magazine Rolling Stone, which took its name from the song and the 1950s blues song "Rollin' Stone", "No other pop song has so thoroughly challenged and transformed the commercial laws and artistic conventions of its time, for all time." Richard Austin, of Sotheby's auction house, said: "Before the release of Like a Rolling Stone, music charts were overrun with short and sweet love songs, many clocking in at three minutes or less. By defying convention with six and a half minutes of dark, brooding poetry, Dylan rewrote the rules for pop music."

In 1966, Dylan told Ralph Gleason: "Rolling Stone's the best song I wrote." In 2004, speaking to Robert Hilburn, Dylan still felt that the song had a special place in his work: "It's like a ghost is writing a song like that, it gives you the song and it goes away. You don't know what it means. Except that the ghost picked me to write the song."

More than 50 years since its release, "Like a Rolling Stone" remains highly regarded among commentators. James Gerard, writing for AllMusic, characterized the song as "one of the most self-righteous and eloquent indictments ever committed to wax", and declared it significant for beginning a new phase in Dylan's career as a songwriter and performer. In an analysis of Dylan's vocal performance in "Like a Rolling Stone" published in Far Out, Sam Kemp highlighted the ironic quality his delivery lent the song, while also praising the ambiguity of the lyrics.

"Like a Rolling Stone" generally ranks highly in polls of the greatest songs ever written, measured by reviewers and fellow songwriters. A 2002 ranking by Uncut and a 2005 poll in Mojo both rated it as Dylan's number one song. As for his personal views on such polls, Dylan told Ed Bradley in a 2004 interview on 60 Minutes that he never pays attention to them, because they change frequently. Dylan's point was illustrated in the "100 Greatest Songs of All Time poll" by Mojo in 2000, which included two Dylan singles, but not "Like a Rolling Stone". Five years later, the magazine named it his number one song. Rolling Stone picked "Like a Rolling Stone" as the number two single of the past 25 years in 1989, and then in 2004 placed the song at number one on its list of the "500 Greatest Songs of All Time". In 2010, Rolling Stone again placed "Like a Rolling Stone" at the top of their list of "500 Greatest Songs Of All Time". Rolling Stone then re-ranked it at number 4 in their 2021 "500 Greatest Songs of All Time" list. In 2006, Pitchfork Media placed it at number 4 on its list of "200 Greatest Songs of the 1960s". In 2020, The Guardian and GQ ranked the song number one and number two, respectively, on their lists of the 50 greatest Bob Dylan songs.

On June 24, 2014, Sotheby's sold Dylan's original hand-written lyrics of "Like a Rolling Stone" at a New York auction devoted to rock memorabilia. The lyrics were sold for $2 million, a record price for a popular music manuscript.

Accolades

Personnel
Bob Dylan – vocals, electric guitar, harmonica
Mike Bloomfield – electric guitar
Bruce Langhorne – tambourine
Al Kooper – Hammond organ
Frank Owens – tack piano
Joe Macho, Jr. – bass guitar
Bobby Gregg – drums

Jimi Hendrix Experience versions

During the earlier part of his career with the Jimi Hendrix Experience, guitarist Jimi Hendrix occasionally performed "Like a Rolling Stone" in concert. Hendrix was an admirer of Bob Dylan, and especially liked "Like a Rolling Stone"; "It made me feel that I wasn't the only one who'd ever felt so low", Hendrix explained.

A live recording from the 1967 Monterey Pop Festival is the best known version and was first released in 1970 on the split album with Otis Redding Historic Performances Recorded at the Monterey International Pop Festival. Music critic Greil Marcus described the atmosphere of the Hendrix recording as "Huge chords ride over the beginning of each verse like rain clouds; the tune is taken very slowly, with Hendrix's thick, street-talk drawl sounding nothing at all like Dylan's Midwestern dust storm." The Experience's performance has been re-released several times, including on Jimi Plays Monterey (1986) and Live at Monterey (2007) albums and associated DVDs.

Chart performance

Weekly charts

Year-end charts

Certifications

Notes

References

Footnotes

Bibliography

External links
 Lyrics at Bob Dylan's official website
 Like a Rolling Stone music video at Bob Dylan website
 "Vocal performance and speech intonation: Bob Dylan's 'Like a Rolling Stone' " by Michael Daley, York University, Toronto
 "The Day Dylan Got It Right", All Things Considered, NPR, November 6, 2015

1965 singles
1965 songs
Bob Dylan songs
Cashbox number-one singles
Columbia Records singles
Grammy Hall of Fame Award recipients
Song recordings produced by Tom Wilson (record producer)
Songs written by Bob Dylan
The Jimi Hendrix Experience songs
The Rolling Stones songs